The 2012 Omiya Ardija season is Omiya Ardija's eighth consecutive season in J. League Division 1. Omiya Ardija are also competing in the 2012 Emperor's Cup and 2012 J. League Cup.

Players

Competitions

J. League

League table

Matches

Source: https://web.archive.org/web/20150412093616/http://www.jleague.jp/en/stats/SFMS01.html

J. League Cup

Group B

Emperor's Cup

References

Omiya Ardija
Omiya Ardija seasons